Where Are They Now? is a television series on VH1 that featured past celebrities and updated on their current professional and personal status. Each episode was dedicated to another genre (from kid stars to stars of Aaron Spelling's notable productions to controversial news figures).

Though not always in sequence, some episodes were a continuation of the motif of episodes from the past. Those episodes sometimes (but not always) had Roman numerals in their title to signify their sequel status.

Episode list

Season 1
One-Hit Wonders
Saturday Night Fever
Signature Songs
Saturday Night Fever II
Rockin' Classics
On Ice
Superheroes
Horror Movie Stars

Season 2
Music Movie Stars
New Wave
Musicians
Kid Stars
Notorious & Newsworthy
Hair Bands
Totally 80s
Video Vixens
Child Stars
Classic Rock
British Invasion
Bad Boys Of Rock
The Rocky Horror Picture...
Teen Idols
The 80s
The 80s II
The Cowsills
The Big Chill
TV Hunks
TV Bombshells
This Is Spinal Tap
Viewer's Choice
Woodstock
Video Vixens II

Season 3
Bad Boys Of Rock II
American Graffiti
Classic Rock II
'80s Teen Idols
The 80s III
90210, Melrose & More
The 80s IV
'70s Teen Idols
AM Classics
Hair Bands II
Girls of Grease
Grease
Guys of Grease
Guilty Pleasures
Girls, Girls, Girls
Girls Night Out
Dance
Disco
Disco Kings & Queens
Episode 20
Ford Supermodels
Girl Power
Disco II
Girlie Show

External links 
 

VH1 original programming
1990s American documentary television series
2000s American documentary television series
1999 American television series debuts
2002 American television series endings